The Lensch-Cunow-Haenisch group was a political faction within the Social Democratic Party of Germany founded in 1915 by anti-revisionist Marxists who despite previously opposing participation in the First World War now supported it. Its name comes from the three principal protagonists: Paul Lensch, Heinrich Cunow and Konrad Haenisch. They followed the initiative of Parvus in advocating a German victory as a positive step for international social democracy. They mobilised Marxist arguments behind the war effort.

In 1907 Parvus had been a critic of German imperialism, publishing Colonial Policy and the Breakdown during the 1907 German federal election, often referred to as the Hottentot Election.

References

Social Democratic Party of Germany politicians
World War I